The 2003–04 Nevada Wolf Pack men's basketball team represented the University of Nevada, Reno during the 2003–04 NCAA Division I men's basketball season. The Wolf Pack, led by fifth-year head coach Trent Johnson, played their home games at the Lawlor Events Center on their campus in Reno, Nevada as members of the Western Athletic Conference (WAC).

After finishing atop the conference regular season standings, Nevada won the WAC tournament to receive an automatic bid to the NCAA tournament as No. 10 seed in the St. Louis Region. The Wolf Pack defeated Michigan State and No. 2 seed Gonzaga to reach the first Sweet Sixteen in program history. In the Regional semifinal, No. 3 seed and eventual national runner-up Georgia Tech ended Nevada's run, 72–67. The team finished with a record of 25–9 (13–5 WAC).

Roster

Schedule and results

|-
!colspan=9 style=| Regular season

|-
!colspan=9 style=| WAC tournament

|-
!colspan=9 style=| NCAA tournament

Source

Rankings

References

Nevada Wolf Pack men's basketball seasons
Nevada
Nevada
Nevada Wolf Pack
Nevada Wolf Pack